Revenge of The Gladiators is a 1964 Italian peplum film written and directed by Luigi Capuano and starring Mickey Hargitay and José Greci.

Plot

The film depicts the Western Roman Empire in the 450s. The city of Rome itself is besieged by Genseric and his Vandals. The empire is depicted as weak and corrupt, while under the control of the ineffectual emperor Valentinian III and his wife Calpurnia. The Roman general Aetius manages to temporarily halt the advance of the Vandals. Fabius, a son of Aetius, falls in love with princess Priscilla, a daughter of the imperial couple. Genseric plans to marry his own son to Priscilla, in a plot to take over the Roman throne. 

Genseric fails to capture Priscilla, but captures Fabius instead. He uses torture while questioning Fabius about the princess' whereabouts. Priscilla surrenders herself to Genseric in exchange for Fabius' safety and freedom. Genseric seemingly agrees to her terms, but eventually double-crosses Priscilla. On her wedding day, Genseric offers Priscilla a crucified Fabius. Fabius' Roman allies soon arrive to rescue him and defeat the Vandals.

Cast

 Mickey Hargitay as Fabius 
 José Greci as Priscilla 
 Livio Lorenzon as Geiserik
 Renato Baldini as General Aetius
 Roldano Lupi as Valentinianus III
 Andrea Checchi as Gabinus 
 Nerio Bernardi as Tidone 
 Andreina Paul as Calpurnia 
 Mirko Ellis as Wilfried
 Giulio Tomei as Priest
 Dante Maggio as Drinker at the Tavern
 Giovanni Cianfriglia as Fulvius 
 Amedeo Trilli as Master the Fortress
 Bruno Scipioni

References

External links

1964 adventure films
Peplum films
Films directed by Luigi Capuano
Films set in the Roman Empire
Films set in the 5th century
Valentinian III
Sword and sandal films
1960s Italian-language films
1960s Italian films